Fred Bisby (1880 – 17 September 1948) was an English professional footballer who played as a winger.

References

1880 births
1948 deaths
Footballers from Sheffield
English footballers
Association football wingers
Kilnhurst Colliery F.C. players
Rawmarsh F.C. players
Grimsby Town F.C. players
Cleethorpes Town F.C. players
Worksop Town F.C. players
Grimsby Rangers F.C. players
Denaby United F.C. players
English Football League players
People from Ecclesfield